Wrotham School is a coeducational secondary school and sixth form with academy status, near Sevenoaks, Kent, England. It has about 760 registered students, with about 130 in the sixth form. In February 2012 the school was placed in the top 3% nationally. The school converted to academy status in April 2013.

Wrotham School Revision Website 
With this years GCSE students nearly at their exams, a new Revision website has been released along with a separate English Language and Literature site. These are resources meant for students and parents to be able to ensure that they are fully ready for their upcoming exams to do the best that they can. Due to these sites being made by the teachers in Wrotham School all of the content on the websites are relevant to the students and none of it will be information that is either wrong or not needed for the exams.

Recent Developments 
Recently Wrotham School has undergone some obvious developments to anyone who is able to see the front of the main school building. They have stripped away the old 'cladding' and front doors to replace it with a new orange and grey design. Wrotham School is constantly changing and constantly becoming a newer, sleeker designed building by the day. Only yesterday, where there used to be a gap above the main reception there is now wooden boarding with a new Wrotham School sign with 3d letters posted on.

New Building (2011-2013)
The new building started in 2011 with the Food Pod complete in September 2011. The Horsa Huts replacement started in March 2012 and phase 1 which includes new science labs, humanities classes plus languages and new changing rooms finished just before the Half term in February 2013. In Oct 2012 the food pod had to have a new roof due to builders not being satisfied with the original one. The new building was opened after Easter 2013

References

External links
 Official Website

Secondary schools in Kent
Academies in Kent

Educational institutions established in 1949
1949 establishments in England